Centre City Tower or Center City Tower may refer to three buildings:

Centre City Tower (Birmingham), United Kingdom
Center City Tower (Philadelphia), United States
Centre City Tower (Pittsburgh), United States

See also
Tower City Center
Centre City Building (Dayton, Ohio)